Enjoy the Ride may refer to:

 Enjoy the Ride (Marie Serneholt album) (2006), by Swedish pop singer Marie Serneholt
 Enjoy the Ride (Marshall Dyllon album) (2001), by country music boy band Marshall Dyllon
 Enjoy the Ride (Sugarland album) (2006), by country duo Sugarland
 "Enjoy the Ride", by Morcheeba, 2008
 "Enjoy the Ride" (Krewella song)
 "Enjoy the Ride", a season 4 episode of the TV series Everwood
 "Enjoy the Ride" (Hollyoaks), storyline from the British soap opera Hollyoaks